Death Row is the tenth studio album by German heavy metal band Accept, released in 1994. It was recorded at Roxx Studios in Pulheim, Germany..

Stefan Kaufmann was still the official drummer for Accept, but drums on "Bad Habits Die Hard" and "Prejudice" are by Stefan Schwarzmann according to the liner notes. Stefan Kaufmann had to leave the band for the subsequent tour because of health problems, and Stefan Schwarzmann then handled drum duties.

Track listing 
All lyrics and music written by Accept and Deaffy, except where noted.
                          

Notes
 "Drifting Apart" is listed as "Drifting Away" on some editions
 "Sodom & Gomorra" includes the song "Sabre Dance" by Armenian composer Aram Khachaturian, running in at 1:24 minutes

Credits 
Band members
 Udo Dirkschneider – vocals
 Wolf Hoffmann – guitars
 Peter Baltes – bass
 Stefan Kaufmann – drums, engineer, mixing

Additional musicians
 Stefan Schwarzmann – drums on "Bad Habits Die Hard" and "Prejudice"

Production
Mathias Bothor – photo
Stefan Böhle Kunsterei, Hamburg – cover design
Published by Breeze Music Gmbh

Charts

References 

1994 albums
Accept (band) albums
RCA Records albums